The United States House Committee on Foreign Affairs, also known as the House Foreign Affairs Committee, is a standing committee of the U.S. House of Representatives with jurisdiction over bills and investigations concerning the foreign affairs of the United States. Since 2023, the chair of the Foreign Affairs Committee has been Michael McCaul of Texas.

The committee has a broad mandate to oversee legislation regarding the impact of national security developments on foreign policy; war powers, treaties, executive agreements, and military deployments abroad; foreign assistance; arms control; international economic policy; and other matters. Many of its responsibilities are delegated to one of six standing subcommittees, which have jurisdiction over issues related to their respective region in the world. The committee also oversees the U.S. Department of State, American embassies and diplomats, and the U.S. Agency for International Development.

During two separate periods, 1975 to 1978 and 1995 to 2007, the Foreign Affairs Committee was renamed the Committee on International Relations; its duties and jurisdiction remained unchanged.

Its counterpart in the Senate is the Committee on Foreign Relations.

Members, 118th Congress

Resolutions electing members:  (Chair),  (Ranking Member),  (R),  (D),  (Removing Omar),  (D)

Subcommittees
Whereas until the 118th Congress, subcommittees tended to combine jurisdiction over particular regions of the globe with jurisdiction over broader policy areas (e.g. terrorism or energy policy), in the 118th Congress, the subcommittees were reconfigured to strictly focus on geographical areas, with the exception of global issues and international organisations which received their own subcommittee.

List of chairs
Data from the committee's official website:

Previous members

117th Congress

Resolutions electing members:  (Chair),  (Ranking Member),  (D),  (R),  (R),  (D)

Subcommittees

116th Congress

Sources:  (Chair),  (Ranking Member),  (D),  (R),  (R)

Subcommittees

115th Congress

See also
 List of current United States House of Representatives committees

References

External links

 U.S. House Committee on Foreign Affairs (Archive)
 House Foreign Affairs Committee. Legislation activity and reports, Congress.gov.

Foreign Affairs
Foreign relations of the United States
United States diplomacy
Parliamentary committees on Foreign Affairs